Pogonocherus propinquus is a species of beetle in the family Cerambycidae. It was described by Fall in 1910. It is known from Canada and the United States.

References

Pogonocherini
Beetles described in 1910